Thomas Chatterton Williams (born March 26, 1981) is an American cultural critic and author. He is the author of the 2019 book Self-Portrait in Black and White and a contributing writer at The Atlantic. He is a visiting professor of the humanities and senior fellow at the Hannah Arendt Center at Bard College, and a 2022 Guggenheim fellow.

Formerly, Thomas was a contributing writer at The New York Times Magazine and an Easy Chair columnist for Harper's Magazine.

Early life and education
Thomas Chatterton Williams was born on March 26, 1981, in Newark, New Jersey, to a black father, Clarence Williams, and a white mother, Kathleen. Named after the English poet Thomas Chatterton, he was raised in Fanwood, New Jersey, and attended Union Catholic Regional High School in Scotch Plains. Williams graduated from Georgetown University with a bachelor's degree in philosophy. He also completed a master's degree from New York University's Cultural Reporting and Criticism program.

Career
In 2010, Williams released his first book, Losing My Cool: How a Father's Love and 15,000 Books Beat Hip-Hop Culture. The book is a coming-of-age memoir, mirroring the author's childhood and adolescence in New Jersey to his father's experience in the segregated South.

Williams released his second book, Self-Portrait in Black and White: Unlearning Race, on October 15, 2019. He became a 2019 New America Fellow and a Berlin Prize recipient.

In 2020, Williams wrote the initial draft of "A Letter on Justice and Open Debate", an open letter in Harper's Magazine, signed by 152 public figures. It criticized what the letter argued was a culture of "intolerance of opposing views".

Williams is now a contributing writer at The Atlantic, a visiting professor of the humanities and senior fellow at the Hannah Arendt Center for Politics and Humanities at Bard College, and a 2022 Guggenheim fellow. Formerly, Williams was a contributing writer at The New York Times Magazine and at Harper's Magazine.

Personal life
Williams married French journalist and author Valentine Faure in France in 2011. He lives in Paris, with Faure and their two children.

Bibliography

References

External links

1981 births
Living people
20th-century African-American people
21st-century African-American people
African-American journalists
African-American non-fiction writers
American expatriates in France
American literary critics
American male journalists
Berlin Prize recipients
Georgetown College (Georgetown University) alumni
New York University alumni
People from Fanwood, New Jersey
Union Catholic Regional High School alumni
Writers from Newark, New Jersey
Writers from Paris